Harpalus potanini is a species of ground beetle in the subfamily Harpalinae. It was described by Tschitscherine in 1906.

References

potanini
Beetles described in 1906